Westford is a town in Middlesex County, Massachusetts, United States. The population was at 24,643 at the time of the 2020 Census.

History

Westford began as 'West Chelmsford', a village in the town of Chelmsford. The village of West Chelmsford grew large enough to sustain its own governance in 1729, and was officially incorporated as Westford that year on September 23.

In the late 18th and early 19th centuries, Westford primarily produced granite, apples, and worsted yarn. The Abbot Worsted Company was said to be the first company in the nation to use camel hair for worsted yarns.

Paul Revere's son attended Westford Academy and a bell cast by Revere graces its lobby today. A weather vane made by Paul Revere sits atop the Abbot Elementary school.

By the end of the American Civil War, as roads and transportation improved, Westford began to serve as a residential suburb for the factories of Lowell, becoming one of the earliest notable examples of suburban sprawl. Throughout the 20th century (and with the invention of the automobile), Westford progressively grew, continuing to serve as residential housing for the industries of Lowell, and later, Boston.

In the 1960s, the town was home to one of the research sites supporting Project West Ford.

By the 1970s, with the advent of the 128 Technology Belt, Westford began to act as a suburb for high-tech firms in Burlington, Woburn, and other areas, and later became a center of technology itself.

By the 1990s, Westford was home to offices for Cascade Communications (now part of Nokia), NETSCOUT, Red Hat, Samsung, Sonus Networks, Seagate, Iris Associates and many other technology firms, most located along Massachusetts Route 110, parallel to I-495. It is also the North American headquarters for Puma, which holds a road race in town.

Geography

Regionally, it is on the edge of the Merrimack Valley, Northern Middlesex County, and the Metrowest regions of Massachusetts.

Colloquially, the town is divided into different regions based on location, including Forge Village, Nabnasset, Graniteville, Parker Village, and Center of Town.

The town was rated as #11 Best Places to live by Money.com in 2013.

Demographics

As of the 2010 census there were 21,951 people, 7,498 households, and 6,165 families residing in the town. The racial makeup of the town was 76.1% White, 0.40% African American, 0.1% Native American, 22.6% Asian (10.7% Indian, 8.2% Chinese, 1.6% Korean, 0.3% Cambodian, 0.2% Vietnamese, 0.2% Japanese, 0.1% Filipino, 0.1% Pakistani, 0.1% Bangladeshi), 0.0% Pacific Islander, 0.30% from other races, and 1.5% from two or more races. Hispanic or Latino of any race were 1.5% of the population.

As of the 2010 census, there were 7,498 households, out of which 45.3% had children under the age of 18 living with them, 72.5% were married couples living together, 7.3% had a female head of household, and 17.8% were other families. The average household size was 2.93 and the average family size was 3.27.

In the town, the population was spread out, with 31.8% under the age of 18, 4.2% from 18 to 24, 32.8% from 25 to 44, 23.9% from 45 to 64, and 7.2% who were 65 years of age or older. The median age was 37 years. For every 100 females, there were 99.0 males. For every 100 females age 18 and over, there were 95.4 males.

The median income for a household in the town was $121,136, and the median income for a family was $137,230. The per capita income for the town was $48,951. About 1.3% of families and 1.7% of the population were below the poverty line, including 2.2% of those under age 18 and 1.0% of those age 65 or over.

Government

Education

Westford Public Schools

The Superintendent of Westford's Public Schools is Christopher Chew, who has held that role since 2021. The Assistant Superintendent is Kerry Clery.

 Westford Academy, Public High School
 Lloyd G. Blanchard Middle School, Public Middle School
 Stony Brook Middle School, Public Middle School
 Norman E. Day Elementary School, Public Elementary School (3–5)
 Abbot Elementary, Public Elementary School (3–5)
 John A. Crisafulli Elementary, Public Elementary School (3–5)
 Col. John Robinson School, Public Elementary School (K–2)
 Nabnasset Elementary School, Public Elementary School (K–2)
 Rita Edwards Miller School, Public Elementary School (K–2)

Nashoba Valley Technical High School District
Nashoba Valley Technical High School enrolls students from Westford, Chelmsford, Ayer, Groton, Littleton, Townsend, Shirley, and Pepperell

Established in 1968, Nashoba Valley Technical High School is a public, four-year, vocational high school.

 Nashoba Valley Technical High School, Public Regional Vocational Technical (known as Nashoba Tech, or The Tech)

Transportation

Freight travels daily through Westford over the tracks of the historic Stony Brook Railroad. The line currently serves as a major corridor of Pan Am Railways' District 3 which connects New Hampshire and Maine with western Massachusetts, Vermont, and New York. Interstate 495 also passes through the town, linking it to other parts of the state as well as New Hampshire. US-3 passes through the town, although the nearest interchanges are located in neighboring Tyngsborough (exit 34) and Chelmsford (exit 33).

The LRTA 15 bus connects Westford along Route 110 with Chelmsford and the Lowell train station on the MBTA Commuter Rail Lowell Line.

Local routes passing through town are Massachusetts Routes 110, 40, 225, and 27.

Notable people

 Joel Abbot (1793–1855), born in Westford, noted naval officer
 Pat Bradley, Member of World Golf Hall of Fame
 Michael Fucito, Retired Major League Soccer player, first drafted by the Seattle Sounders FC
 Pamela L. Gay, Astronomer
 Martha Reed Mitchell (1818-1902), philanthropist and socialite
 Ellen Henrietta Swallow Richards, creator of the field of home economics, first woman admitted to MIT, co-founder of American Association of University Women
 Lt. Col. John Robinson, Revolutionary War soldier
 Aaron Stanford, actor known for Nikita
 Nettie Stevens, American geneticist

Points of interest

 Westford Knight stone and memorial
 Nashoba Valley Ski Area
Fairview Cemetery

References

Further reading

1871 Atlas of Massachusetts. by Wall & Gray.Map of Massachusetts. Map of Middlesex County.
  History of Middlesex County, Massachusetts, Volume 1 (A-H),  Volume 2 (L-W) compiled by Samuel Adams Drake, published 1879 and 1880. 572 and 505 pages.  Westford section in volume 2 page 475 by Hodgman and Julian Abbott.
 History of the Town of Westford, in the County of Middlesex, Massachusetts, by Rev. Edwin Ruthven Hodgman, published 1883, 494 pages.
A Brief History of Westford, by Robert W. Oliphant, Town Historian.

External links

Town of Westford
The Westford Web Community Web Site
Westford Historical Society and Museum

 
Towns in Middlesex County, Massachusetts
Towns in Massachusetts